Tyler Gerald Burrell (born August 22, 1967) is an American actor and comedian. Burrell is best known for his role as Phil Dunphy on the ABC sitcom Modern Family, for which he won the Primetime Emmy Award for Outstanding Supporting Actor in a Comedy Series in 2011 and 2014 (from eight consecutive nominations) and five Screen Actors Guild Awards: one for Outstanding Performance by a Male Actor in a Comedy Series in 2013 and four consecutive awards for Outstanding Performance by an Ensemble in a Comedy Series, shared with the cast from 2011 to 2014.

Burrell has had several roles in Broadway shows such as Macbeth and off-Broadway plays such as Burn This. He also had starring roles on the television series Out of Practice and Back to You. He has appeared in films such as Evolution, Black Hawk Down, Dawn of the Dead, Muppets Most Wanted, and as Doc Samson in  The Incredible Hulk. He has also voiced characters in the animated films Mr. Peabody & Sherman, Finding Dory, and Storks.

Early life 
Tyler Gerald Burrell was born in Grants Pass, Oregon, on August 22, 1967, the son of teacher Sheri Rose (née Hauck) and family therapist Gary Gerald Burrell (1940–1989). He has a younger brother, Duncan. He is mostly of English and German descent, though he discovered via Finding Your Roots that he is also of African descent through his four times great-grandmother, a formerly enslaved girl from Tennessee who became a homesteader in Oregon. He grew up in Applegate, Oregon, near the California border. He attended Hidden Valley High School in Grants Pass, where he played football and was a lineman for the Hidden Valley Mustangs. 

While attending college at  the University of Oregon, Burrell became a member of the Sigma Chi Fraternity and worked as a bartender at the Oregon Shakespeare Festival. He later attended Southern Oregon University in Ashland, graduating with a bachelor's degree in theatre arts in 1993. (Fifteen years later, in 2008, he was the school's commencement speaker.)

Continuing his education at Penn State University, he earned an MFA and was a member of the Theatre 100 Company along with Keegan-Michael Key. In 1999, Burrell worked as a festival actor at the Utah Shakespeare Festival. He has also stated that for a period of time in graduate school, he lived out of his van to save money.

Career 
Burrell's first credited film roles were 2001's Evolution and Black Hawk Down. He subsequently appeared in the 2004 remake of Dawn of the Dead, and in several stage roles (like 2000's Broadway production of Macbeth, and the off-Broadway plays Corners, The Blue Demon, Burn This, and Show People).

He was a co writer and actor in the original production of the offbeat comedy The Red Herring O' Happiness directed by Russell Dyball. Burrell's stage work also includes writing and working in the off Broadway play Babble with his brother, Duncan. He has also made an appearance as a New Jersey prosecutor in Law & Order: Special Victims Unit.

After that, Burrell was cast as Oliver Barnes, a shallow but well meaning plastic surgeon, on the CBS sitcom Out of Practice (2005–06), also created by screenwriter Christopher Lloyd. The show was canceled in May 2006, with eight episodes remaining unaired in the United States. After the show's cancellation, he played Allan Arbus in the film Fur: An Imaginary Portrait of Diane Arbus. In the same year, he also appeared in Friends with Money and The Darwin Awards.
In 2007, he had a small role in the film National Treasure: Book of Secrets as the curator of the White House followed by a starring role in the sitcom Back to You on Fox later that same year. On the show, created by Steven Levitan and Christopher Lloyd, Burrell played a field reporter (alongside Kelsey Grammer and Patricia Heaton). The show was canceled in 2008.

In the 2008 Marvel film adaptation of the comic The Incredible Hulk Burrell played Leonard Samson (without superpowers) who had a short relationship with Betty Ross.

He had a large role as realtor Phil Dunphy in the acclaimed ABC situation comedy Modern Family which is also created by Christopher Lloyd and Steve Levitan. For his performance, he received eight consecutive Primetime Emmy Award nominations for Outstanding Supporting Actor in a Comedy Series (2010–2017), winning the award twice in 2011 and 2014.

He also received nominations for the Screen Actors Guild Award for Outstanding Performance by a Male Actor in a Comedy Series for his role, sharing the Screen Actors Guild Award for Outstanding Performance by an Ensemble in a Comedy Series with his co stars. He was the recipient of the individual SAG award in 2014, defeating Alec Baldwin, who had previously won the award seven years in a row.

Burrell also appears as Phil in commercials for National Association of Realtors.

In November 2014, Burrell signed an overall deal with 20th Century Fox Television to develop his own comedy projects. In July 2020, his overall deal with 20th Century Fox continued with the establishment of his own production company, Desert Whale Productions.

His web series Boondoggle, loosely based on Burrell's own life, debuted in June 2016 on ABC.com and ABCd. He was nominated for the Primetime Emmy Award for Outstanding Actor in a Short Form Comedy or Drama Series in July 2017.

Other ventures 
Burrell owns The Eating Establishment, a restaurant in Park City, Utah, as well as two bars in Salt Lake City called Bar X and Beer Bar, located next to each other with interconnecting doors.

When the COVID-19 pandemic shut down Salt Lake City's bars and restaurants in March 2020, Burrell and his wife used $100,000 of their own money to create Tip Your Server, a crowd-sourced online fund to help out-of-work wait staff in Utah, where they had previously kept their main residence.

Personal life 
Burrell married his girlfriend Holly on August 18, 2000. They resided in New York City until moving to Salt Lake City in 2008. They still own a two-bedroom apartment in New York's Astoria neighborhood, which they rent out. At one point, they relocated to Southern California for Burrell's work on Modern Family. In March 2010, Burrell said that they had adopted a baby girl and another girl two years later.

Burrell is a self-described lifelong fan of the Oregon Ducks, Portland Trail Blazers, New York Mets, and St. Louis Rams (now known as the Los Angeles Rams after their relocation to California).

Filmography

Film

Television

Awards and nominations

References

External links 

 
 
 

1967 births
20th-century American male actors
21st-century American male actors
American male voice actors
American male film actors
American male television actors
American people of English descent
American people of German descent
American people of African descent
Living people
Male actors from Grants Pass, Oregon
Outstanding Performance by a Male Actor in a Comedy Series Screen Actors Guild Award winners
Outstanding Performance by a Supporting Actor in a Comedy Series Primetime Emmy Award winners
Penn State College of Arts and Architecture alumni
People from Ashland, Oregon
Southern Oregon University alumni
University of Oregon alumni